Nalchar is one of the 60 Legislative Assembly constituencies of Tripura state in India. It is in Sipahijala district and is reserved for candidates belonging to the Scheduled Castes. Nalchar is also part of West Tripura Lok Sabha constituency.

Members of Legislative Assembly
 1972: Benode Behari Das, Indian National Congress
 1977: Sumanta Kumar Das, Communist Party of India (Marxist)
 1983: Narayan Dass, Indian National Congress
 1988: Sukumar Barman, Communist Party of India (Marxist)
 1993: Sukumar Barman, Communist Party of India (Marxist)
 1998: Sukumar Barman, Communist Party of India (Marxist)
 2003: Sukumar Barman, Communist Party of India (Marxist)
 2008: Sukumar Barman, Communist Party of India (Marxist)
 2013: Sukumar Barman, Communist Party of India (Marxist)

Election results

2018

See also
List of constituencies of the Tripura Legislative Assembly
 Sipahijala district
 Nalchar
 Tripura West (Lok Sabha constituency)

References

Sipahijala district
Assembly constituencies of Tripura